Oh We Do Like to Be Beside the Seaside is the debut Studio album by Melbourne based band, The Vasco Era. It peaked at No. 40 on the ARIA Albums Chart.

At the J Awards of 2007, the album was nominated for Australian Album of the Year.

Track listing 
 "When It First Showed Up" – 2:56
 "When We All Lost It" – 1:47
 "When We Tried to Get You to Settle Down" – 3:12
 "When You Went" – 3:29
 "When We Tried to Party to Forget About It" – 4:46
 "When We Forgot to Ask Ourselves Why It Ever Came" – 3:23
 "When We Lost Faith in Everyone, Especially Middle-Aged People" – 1:42
 "Honey Bee (When It Was Making Weird Love Songs)" – 5:19
 "When We Were Gettin' to Forgiving You" – 2:11
 "When the Good Times Were Coming" – 6:08\

Charts

References 

2007 albums
The Vasco Era albums